The 2007–08 season of the Botola, the first division of Moroccan football.

Table

Botola seasons
Morroco
1